The National Defense Authorization Act (NDAA) is the name for each of a series of United States federal laws specifying the annual budget and expenditures of the U.S. Department of Defense. The first NDAA was passed in 1961. The U.S. Congress oversees the defense budget primarily through two yearly bills: the National Defense Authorization Act and defense appropriations bills. The authorization bill is the jurisdiction of the Senate Armed Services Committee and House Armed Services Committee and determines the agencies responsible for defense, establishes recommended funding levels, and sets the policies under which money will be spent. The appropriations bill provides funds.

The passage of a Defense Authorization Act is often used by Congress to honour a senior congress member or other individual. For example, the National Defense Authorization Act for Fiscal Year 2001 is known as the "Floyd D. Spence National Defense Authorization Act for Fiscal Year 2001" in honour of Representative Floyd D. Spence of South Carolina.

Legislation from 2007 onwards

 John Warner National Defense Authorization Act for Fiscal Year 2007, this NDAA is formally named after John Warner, a U.S. war veteran, long-term Senator, Senate Armed Services Committee chairman, and Secretary of the Navy from Virginia.
 National Defense Authorization Act for Fiscal Year 2008, 
Duncan Hunter National Defense Authorization Act for Fiscal Year 2009: "expresses the sense of Congress that the Honorable Duncan Hunter, Representative from California, has discharged his official duties with integrity and distinction, has served the House of Representatives and the American people selflessly, and deserves the sincere gratitude of Congress and the Nation". Title 8, Subtitle G: Governmentwide Acquisition Improvements, is known as the "Clean Contracting Act", and focused on improvements to government procurement such as limiting the term of non-competitive contracts to one year (section 862) and prohibiting excessive use by contractors of sub-contractors or "tiers of sub-contractors" (section 866).
 National Defense Authorization Act for Fiscal Year 2010, this NDAA contains important hate crimes legislation.
 Ike Skelton National Defense Authorization Act for Fiscal Year 2011, this NDAA is formally named after Ike Skelton, a long-term Congressman and Chairman of the House Armed Services Committee from Missouri.
 National Defense Authorization Act for Fiscal Year 2012, this NDAA contains several controversial sections, the chief being §§ 1021–1022, which affirm provisions authorizing the indefinite military detention of civilians, including U.S. citizens, without habeas corpus or due process, contained in the Authorization for Use of Military Force (AUMF), .
 National Defense Authorization Act for Fiscal Year 2013
The National Defense Authorization Act for Fiscal Year 2014 (NDAA 2014) was a United States federal law that specified the budget and expenditures of the United States Department of Defense (DOD) for Fiscal Year 2014. The law authorized the DOD to spend $607 billion in Fiscal Year 2014.  On December 26, 2013, President Barack Obama signed the bill into law. This was the 53rd consecutive year that a National Defense Authorization Act has been passed.
The Carl Levin and Howard P. "Buck" McKeon National Defense Authorization Act for Fiscal Year 2015 was one of the proposed NDAA bills for fiscal year 2015. On May 8, 2014, the House Armed Services Committee ordered the bill reported (amended) by a vote of 61-0. The Committee spent 12 hours debating the bill and voting on hundreds of different amendments before voting to pass it.
 National Defense Authorization Act for Fiscal Year 2016
 National Defense Authorization Act for Fiscal Year 2017
 National Defense Authorization Act for Fiscal Year 2018
 John S. McCain National Defense Authorization Act for Fiscal Year 2019, this NDAA is formally named after John S. McCain III, a U.S. war veteran, prisoner of war, long-term Senator, Chairman of the Senate Armed Services Committee, and 2008 Republican Presidential Nominee.
 National Defense Authorization Act for Fiscal Year 2020, this NDAA formally established the United States Space Force as an independent branch of the Armed Forces.
 William M. (Mac) Thornberry National Defense Authorization Act for Fiscal Year 2021, this NDAA is formally named after William McClellan "Mac" Thornberry, a long-term Congressman, and ranking member of the House Armed Services Committee.
 National Defense Authorization Act for Fiscal Year 2022
 James M. Inhofe National Defense Authorization Act for Fiscal Year 2023, named after James M. Inhofe, a long-term Senator, and ranking member of the Senate Armed Services Committee.

See also

 Clinger–Cohen Act, part of the National Defense Authorization Act for Fiscal Year 1996
 McCarran Internal Security Act

References

Further reading
 Christophe Paulussen, The US NDAA and its Controversial Counter-Terrorism Provisions (International Centre for Counter-Terrorism – The Hague, 2012)

External links
 National Defense Authorization Acts for 1996 to 2016
 National Defense Authorization Act for Fiscal Years 1988 and 1989, from GovTrack.us
 National Defense Authorization Act for Fiscal Year 2005, from the Congressional Budget Office
 National Defense Authorization Act for Fiscal Year 2007, from GovTrack.us
 National Defense Authorization Act for Fiscal Year 2008, from GovTrack.us
 National Defense Authorization Act for Fiscal Year 2009, from GovTrack.us
 National Defense Authorization Act for Fiscal Year 2010:  and 
 National Defense Authorization Act for Fiscal Year 2011, from GovTrack.us
 National Defense Authorization Act for Fiscal Year 2012, from GovTracks.us
 S. 1867 : AN ACT To authorize appropriations for fiscal year 2012 for military activities of the Department of Defense
  from Reuters.com
  pdf of the 112-page ruling from UNITED STATES DISTRICT COURT SOUTHERN DISTRICT OF NEW YORK

U.S. National Defense Authorization Acts